Sebastián Elorza (born 17 January 1939) is a Spanish racing cyclist. He rode in the 1963 Tour de France.

References

External links
 

1939 births
Living people
Spanish male cyclists
Place of birth missing (living people)
People from Azkoitia
Sportspeople from Gipuzkoa
Cyclists from the Basque Country (autonomous community)